A satellite telephone, satellite phone or satphone is a type of mobile phone that connects to other phones or the telephone network by radio link through satellites orbiting the Earth instead of terrestrial cell sites, as cellphones do. Therefore, they can work in most geographic locations on the Earth's surface, as long as open sky and the line-of-sight between the phone and the satellite are provided. Depending on the architecture of a particular system, coverage may include the entire Earth or only specific regions. Satellite phones provide similar functionality to terrestrial mobile telephones; voice calling, text messaging, and low-bandwidth Internet access are supported through most systems. The advantage of a satphone is that it can be used in such regions where local terrestrial communication infrastructures, such as landline and cellular networks, are not available.   

Satphones are popular on expeditions into remote locations, hunting, fishing, maritime sector, humanitarian missions, business  trips, and mining in hard-to-reach areas, where there is no reliable cellular service. Satellite telephones rarely get disrupted by natural disasters on Earth or human actions such as war, so they have proven to be dependable communication tools in emergency situations, when the local communications system can be compromised. 

The mobile equipment, also known as a terminal, varies widely. Early satellite phone handsets had a size and weight comparable to that of a late-1980s or early-1990s mobile phone, but usually with a large retractable antenna. More recent satellite phones are similar in size to a regular mobile phone while some prototype satellite phones have no distinguishable difference from an ordinary smartphone.

A fixed installation, such as one used aboard a ship, may include large, rugged, rack-mounted electronics, and a steerable microwave antenna on the mast that automatically tracks the overhead satellites. Smaller installations using VoIP over a two-way satellite broadband service such as BGAN or VSAT bring the costs within the reach of leisure vessel owners. Internet service satellite phones have notoriously poor reception indoors, though it may be possible to get a consistent signal near a window or in the top floor of a building if the roof is sufficiently thin. The phones have connectors for external antennas that can be installed in vehicles and buildings. The systems also allow for the use of repeaters, much like terrestrial mobile phone systems.

In the early 2020s, various conventional mobile phones began to integrate satellite messaging connectivity and satellite emergency services for use in remote regions, where there is no reliable terrestrial network.

Satellite network

Geostationary satellites
Some satellite phones use satellites in geostationary orbit (GSO), which appear at a fixed position in the sky. These systems can maintain near-continuous global coverage with only three or four satellites, reducing the launch costs. The satellites used for these systems are very heavy (about 5000 kg) and expensive to build and launch. The amount of bandwidth available on these systems is substantially higher than that of the low Earth orbit (LEO) systems; all three active systems provide portable satellite Internet using laptop-sized terminals with speeds ranging from 60 to 512 kbit per second (kbps).

Geostationary satellite phones can only be used at lower latitudes, generally between 70 degrees north of the equator and 70 degrees south of the equator. At higher latitudes the satellite appears at such a low angle in the sky that radio frequency interference from terrestrial sources in the same frequency bands can interfere with the signal.

Another disadvantage of geostationary satellite systems is that in many areas—even where a large amount of open sky is present—the line-of-sight between the phone and the satellite is broken by obstacles such as steep hills and forest. The user will need to find an area with line-of-sight before using the phone. This is not the case with LEO services: even if the signal is blocked by an obstacle, one can wait a few minutes until another satellite passes overhead, but a GSO satellite may drop a call when line of sight is lost.
 ACeS: This former Indonesia-based small regional operator provided voice and data services in East Asia, South Asia, and Southeast Asia using a single satellite. It ceased operations in 2014.
 Inmarsat: The oldest satellite phone operator, a British company founded in 1979. It originally provided large fixed installations for ships, but has recently entered the market of hand-held phones in a joint venture with ACeS. The company operates eleven satellites. Coverage is available on most of the Earth, except polar regions.
 Thuraya: Established in 1997, United Arab Emirates-based Thuraya's satellites provide coverage across Europe, Africa, the Middle East, Asia and Australia.
 MSAT / SkyTerra: An American satellite-phone company that uses equipment similar to Inmarsat, but plans to launch a service using hand-held devices in the Americas similar to Thuraya's.
 Terrestar: Satellite-phone system for North America.
 ICO Global Communications: An American satellite-phone company which has launched a single geosynchronous satellite, not yet active.

Low Earth orbit
Satphones may utilize satellites in low Earth orbit (LEO). The advantages include the possibility of providing worldwide wireless coverage with no gaps. Since the satellites are not geostationary, they move with respect to the ground. A given satellite is only in view of a phone for a short time, so the call must be "handed off" electronically to another satellite when one passes beyond the local horizon. Depending on the positions of both the satellite and terminal, a usable pass of an individual LEO satellite will typically last 4–15 minutes on average. At least one satellite must have line-of-sight to every coverage area at all times to guarantee coverage; thus a constellation of satellites, typically 40 to 70, is required to maintain worldwide coverage.
 Globalstar: A network covering most of the world's landmass using 48 active satellites. However, many areas of the Earth's surface are left without coverage, since a satellite requires to be in range of an Earth station gateway. Satellites fly in an inclined orbit of 52 degrees, therefore polar regions cannot be covered. The network went into full commercial service in February 2000. A second-generation constellation consists of 24 low Earth orbiting (LEO) satellites. The launch of the second-generation constellation was completed on February 6, 2013.
 Iridium: A network operating 66 satellites in a polar orbit that claims to have coverage everywhere on Earth. Radio cross-links are used between satellites to relay data to the nearest satellite with a connection to an Earth station. Commercial service started in November 1998 and fell into Chapter 11 bankruptcy in August 1999. In 2001, service was re-established by Iridium Satellite LLC. Iridium NEXT, a second-generation constellation of the communications satellites, was completed on January 11, 2019.
Both systems, based in the United States, started in the late 1990s, but soon went into bankruptcy after failing to gain enough subscribers to fund launch costs. They are now operated by new owners who bought the assets for a fraction of their original cost and are now both planning to launch replacement constellations supporting higher bandwidth. Data speeds for current networks are between 2200 and 9600 bit/s using a satellite handset.

A third system was announced in 2022 when T-Mobile US and SpaceX announced a partnership to add satellite cellular service to Starlink Gen2 satellites that are to begin launching to orbit in late 2022. The service is aimed to provide dead-zone cell phone coverage across the US using existing midband PCS spectrum that T-Mobile owns. Cell coverage will begin with messaging and expand to include voice and limited data services later, with testing to begin in 2023. With Starlink Gen2 sats in low-Earth orbit using existing PCS spectrum, T-Mobile plans to be able to connect by satellite to ordinary mobile devices, unlike earlier satellite phones in the market which used specialized radios to connect to geosynchronous-orbit satellites, with characteristic long communications lag time. T-Mobile has offered to extend the offering globally if cellular carriers in other countries wish to exchange roaming services via T-Mobile partnership with SpaceX, with other carriers working with their regulators to enable midband communications landing rights on a country-by-country basis. Bandwidth will be limited to approximately 2 to 4 megabits per second spread across a very large cell coverage area; so 1000 to 2000 voice calls, or a greater number of text messages, can happen simultaneously in a cell. The size of a single coverage cell has not yet been specified.

Geotracking

LEO systems have the ability to track a mobile unit's location using Doppler navigation from the satellite. However, this method can be inaccurate by tens of kilometers. On some Iridium hardware the coordinates can be extracted using AT commands, while recent Globalstar handsets will display them on the screen.

Most VSAT terminals can be reprogrammed in-field using AT-commands to bypass automatic acquisition of GPS coordinates and instead accept manually injected GPS coordinates.

One-way services
Some satellite phone networks provide a one-way paging channel to alert users in poor coverage areas (such as indoors) of the incoming call. When the alert is received on the satellite phone it must be taken to an area with better coverage before the call can be accepted.

Globalstar provides a one-way data uplink service, typically used for asset tracking.

Iridium operates a one-way pager service as well as the call alert feature.

Cost

The Iridium 9505A, released in 2001, sold in March 2010 for over US$1,000. Satellite phones are purpose-built for one particular network and cannot be switched to other networks. The price of handsets varies with network performance. If a satellite phone provider encounters trouble with its network, handset prices will fall, then increase once new satellites are launched. Similarly, handset prices will increase when calling rates are reduced.

Among the most expensive satellite phones are BGAN terminals, often costing several thousand US dollars. These phones provide about 0.5 Mbit/s Internet and voice communications. Satellite phones are sometimes subsidised by the provider if one signs a post-paid contract, but subsidies are usually only a few hundred US dollars or less.

Since most satellite phones are built under license or the manufacturing of handsets is contracted out to OEMs, operators have a large influence over the selling price. Satellite networks operate under proprietary protocols, making it difficult for manufacturers to independently make handsets.

A startup is proposing the use of standard mobile phone technology in satellites to enable low bandwidth text message with satellites from cheap mobile phones.

Calling cost

The cost of making voice calls from a satellite phone varies from around $0.15 to $2 per minute, while calling them from landlines and regular mobile phones is more expensive. Costs for data transmissions (particularly broadband data) can be much higher. Rates from landlines and mobile phones range from $3 to $14 per minute with Iridium, Thuraya and Inmarsat being some of the most expensive networks to call. The receiver of the call pays nothing, unless they are being called via a special reverse-charge service.

Calls between different satellite phone networks are often very expensive, with calling rates of up to $15 per minute.

Calls from satellite phones to landlines are usually around $0.80 to $1.50 per minute unless special offers are used. Such promotions are usually bound to a particular geographic area where traffic is low.

Most satellite phone networks have pre-paid plans, with vouchers ranging from $100 to $5,000.

Virtual country codes

Satellite phones are usually issued with numbers in a special country calling code.

Inmarsat satellite phones are issued with codes +870. In the past, additional country codes were allocated to different satellites, but the codes +871 to +874 were phased out at the end of 2008 leaving Inmarsat users with the same country code, regardless of which satellite their terminal is registered with.

Low Earth orbit systems including some of the defunct ones have been allocated number ranges in the International Telecommunication Union's Global Mobile Satellite System virtual country code +881. Iridium satellite phones are issued with codes +881 6 and +881 7. Globalstar, although allocated +881 8 and +881 9 use U.S. telephone numbers except for service resellers located in Brazil, which use the +881 range.

Small regional satellite phone networks are allocated numbers in the +882 code designated for "international networks" which is not used exclusively for satellite phone networks.

Legal restrictions
In some countries, possession of a satellite phone is illegal. Their signals will usually bypass local telecoms systems, hindering censorship and wiretapping attempts, which has led some intelligence agencies to believe that satellite phones aid terrorist activity. It is also common for restrictions to be in place in countries with oppressive governments regimes as a way to both expose subversive agents within their country and maximize the control of the information that makes it past their borders.
 China – Inmarsat became the first company permitted to sell satellite phones in 2016. China Telecom began selling satellite phones in 2018 and six other satellite phone companies expressed their interest in entering the Chinese market shortly after.
 Cuba
 India – only Inmarsat-based satellite services are permitted within territories and areas under Indian jurisdiction. Importation and operation of all other satellite services, including Thuraya and Iridium, is illegal. International shipping is obliged to comply with Indian Directorate-General of Shipping (DGS) Order No. 02 of 2012 which prohibits the unauthorised import and operation of Thuraya, Iridium and other such satellite phones in Indian waters. The legislation to this effect is Section 6 of Indian Wireless Act and Section 20 of Indian Telegraph Act. International Long Distance (ILD) licences and No Objection Certificates (NOC) issued by Indian Department of Telecommunications (DOT) are mandatory for satellite communication services on Indian territory.
 Myanmar
 North Korea – The US Bureau of Diplomatic Security advises visitors that they have "no right to privacy in North Korea and should assume your communications are monitored" which excludes the possibility of satellite phone technology.
 Russia – in 2012, new regulations governing the use of satellite phones inside Russia or its territories were developed with the stated aim of fighting terrorism by enabling the Russian government to intercept calls. These regulations allow non-Russian visitors to register their SIM cards for use within Russian territory for up to six months.

Security concerns
All modern satellite phone networks encrypt voice traffic to prevent eavesdropping. In 2012, a team of academic security researchers reverse-engineered the two major proprietary encryption algorithms in use. One algorithm (used in GMR-1 phones) is a variant of the A5/2 algorithm used in GSM (used in common mobile phones), and both are vulnerable to cipher-text only attacks. The GMR-2 standard introduced a new encryption algorithm which the same research team also cryptanalysed successfully. Thus satellite phones need additional encrypting if used for high-security applications.

Use in disaster response

Most mobile telephone networks operate close to capacity during normal times, and large spikes in call volumes caused by widespread emergencies often overload the systems when they are needed most. Examples reported in the media where this has occurred include the 1999 İzmit earthquake, the September 11 attacks, the 2006 Kiholo Bay earthquake, the 2003 Northeast blackouts, Hurricane Katrina, the 2007 Minnesota bridge collapse, the 2010 Chile earthquake, and the 2010 Haiti earthquake. Reporters and journalists have also been using satellite phones to communicate and report on events in war zones such as Iraq.

Terrestrial cell antennas and networks can be damaged by natural disasters. Satellite telephony can avoid this problem and be useful during natural disasters. Satellite phone networks themselves are prone to congestion as satellites and spot beams cover a large area with relatively few voice channels.

Integration into conventional mobile phones

In the early 2020s, manufacturers began to integrate satellite connectivity into smartphone devices for use in remote areas, out of the cellular network range. The satellite-to-phone services use L band frequencies, which are compatible with most modern handsets. However, due to the antenna limitations in the conventional phones, in the early stages of implementation satellite connectivity would be limited to the satellite messaging and satellite emergency services.

The Apple iPhone 14 can send emergency text messages via Globalstar satellites. Qualcomm announced a partnership that will allow supported Android phones, starting with Snapdragon 8 Gen 2 chipset, to send and receive text messages via Iridium satellites. In 2022, T-Mobile formed a partnership to use Starlink services via existing LTE/5G NR spectrum. AST SpaceMobile aims to build a cellular space network from scratch. It will allow existing, unmodified smartphones to connect to satellites in areas with coverage gaps.

See also

 Broadband Global Area Network (BGAN)
 Mobile-satellite service
 Satellite internet
 Telecommunications

References

External links

 University of Surrey pages with information on some satellite systems, including currently planned, and defunct proposals such as Teledesic (non-commercial)
 Satellite Phone FAQ (satellite phone services and equipment reviews, non-commercial)
 Satellite mobile system architecture (technical)

 
Emergency communication
Mobile phones
Mobile telecommunications